"Come into My Life" is a song by American singer-songwriter Joyce Sims, released in 1987 as the second single from her debut album, Come into My Life (1987). Written by Sims and produced by Jamaican-born hip hop and electronic-music artist, DJ, remixer and producer Kurtis Mantronik, it was her most successful song and a sizeable hit in Europe. It peaked at number seven on the UK Singles Chart and number ten on the US Billboard R&B singles chart. Elsewhere in Europe, the song charted at number four in West Germany, number seven in the Netherlands and Switzerland, and number nine in Belgium. In both 1995 and 2004, it was re-released with new remixes.

Critical reception
Andy Kellman from AllMusic wrote that "Come into My Life" is "easily the best surrogate, low-budget Loose Ends song recorded". The American magazine Billboard noted that the singer "weaves seductive passages that spin their magic" on the track. The reviewer added, "Sims grasps dance dynamics and club appeal better than most and consistently creates ear-fetching grooves." James Hamilton from Music Weeks RM Dance Update described it as a "sweetly warbled early Eighties style soul swayer".

Track listing

 7" single, US (1987)"Come into My Life" (Radio Version) – 3:35
"Come into My Life" (Dub Version) – 5:08

 12", Germany (1987)"Come into My Life" (Club Version) – 8:19
"Come into My Life" (Dub Version) – 5:04
"Lifetime Love"/"All in All" (Megamix) – 5:08

 12" maxi, US (1987)"Come into My Life" (Club Version) – 8:20
"Come into My Life" (Radio Version) – 3:39
"Come into My Life" (Dub Version) – 5:08
"Come into My Life" (Bonus Beats) – 2:32

 12" (Remixes), US (2004)"Come into My Life" (Club Mix) – 7:25
"Come into My Life" (Deep Mix) – 7:17
"Come into My Life" (Supaflyas Mix) – 3:20
"Come into My Life" (Sanz Remix) – 6:56

 12", US (1995)"Come into My Life" (Radio Version) – 3:40
"Come into My Life" (Club Version) – 7:21
"Come into My Life" (Hip Hop Version) – 5:05
"Come into My Life" (Spanish Version) – 4:31
"All and All" (Radio Version) – 4:00
"All and All" (Extended R&B Version) – 6:31

 CD maxi, Europe (1995)'''
"Come into My Life" (Radio Version) – 3:50
"Come into My Life" (Super Club Mix) – 6:00
"Come into My Life" (US Club Mix) – 5:08
"Come into My Life" (Parkside Late Night Club Mix) – 7:50
"Come into My Life" (Spanish Version) – 4:30
"Come into My Life" (Piano Acapella) – 3:05

Charts

Weekly charts

Year-end charts

In media
 The song was used in the HBO mini-series Show Me a Hero, and can be heard playing on the radio in a scene during the 1995 film Species''.
 The track influenced the Indian song "Dheere Dheere" by Nadeem–Shravan.

References

1987 singles
1995 singles
1987 songs
Disco songs
Sleeping Bag Records singles